Laura Morera is a Spanish ballet dancer who is currently a principal dancer with The Royal Ballet, London.

Early life and training
Morera was born in Madrid. She started going to London to attend Royal Academy of Dance's summer programme when she was seven, and when she was 10, she auditioned for The Royal Ballet School by dancing a solo from Paquita in pointe shoes. She graduated in 1995.

Career
Morera joined The Royal Ballet after she graduated from the school. She became First Artist in 1998, Soloist in 1999, First Soloist in 2002 and Principal Dancer in 2007. She had performed lead roles ballets such as in the title role in the title role in Giselle, Sugar Plum Fairy in The Nutcracker, Natalia Petrovna in Ashton's A Month in the Country, Gypsy Girl in The Two Pigeons, MacMillan's Juliet in Romeo and Juliet, the title role in Manon, Mary Vetsera in Mayerling, the title role in Anastasia and Ttiana in Cranko's Onegin. She won the 2015 Critics' Circle National Dance Award for her performance as Lise in Ashton's La Fille mal gardée.

Outside of the company, Morera and her husband and former Royal Ballet dancer Justin Meissner have a group named Dance Tour International which held gala and workshops in different countries.

Selected repertoire
Morera's repertoire with the Royal Ballet includes:

References

Living people
People from Madrid
Spanish ballerinas
Spanish expatriates in England
Principal dancers of The Royal Ballet
Prima ballerinas
People educated at the Royal Ballet School
Spanish emigrants to the United Kingdom
21st-century ballet dancers
21st-century Spanish dancers
Year of birth missing (living people)
National Dance Award winners